Nachmani is a surname. Notable people with the surname include:
Eden Nachmani (born 1990), Israeli footballer
Omer Nachmani (born 1993), Israeli footballer
Stav Nachmani (born 2002), Israeli footballer

See also